Arthur Bernard Dolino Lui Pio (born February 8, 1982), popularly known as Champ Lui Pio, is a music artist and guitarist and vocalist of Hale.

Biography

Early and personal life
Lui Pio was born on February 8, 1982, in Quezon City, Philippines. He matriculated in Marymount School and earned a degree in Business Administration. He has a sibling named Christian Lui Pio, also known as VJ Chino, who was featured in Hale's music video of their single Kahit Pa and a winner of Myx VJ Search 2008–2015, and is now a sports anchor of TV5. Lui Pio is also the son of Bernardita Dolino and musician Arturo Lui-Pio, also known as Nonoy Tan of the 1980s band Wadab. He also has two sisters: Cha Lui Pio and Cher Lui Pio.

Raised in the Iglesia ni Cristo faith, he converted to Roman Catholicism when he got engaged to his non-showbiz girlfriend, Claire Nery. He married Nery in Muntinlupa in January 2022.

2004–2010: Hale
In 2004, Lui Pio joined Hale as guitarist and vocalist. As a group, the band managed to spawn 4 mainstream albums and 18 mainstream singles, together with 2 jingles meant to promote Nescafé and Close-Up. He also helped established the Treehouse Productions whose sole purpose is to help the needy children suffering from mental and physical illnesses through music. Other musical acts eventually signed up for Treehouse Productions to help achieve the band's purpose and objectives.

On August 6, 2010, Lui Pio, together with the band, publicly announced that they had no more plans in producing more music as a band and therefore disband. This development came after Arthur himself announced his intention to start a solo music career and as an actor.

2010–present: Synergy and Mecca Music

Currently, he is now signed under local film conglomerate VIVA Films so he could push on with his embarkment as an actor.

As a solo artist, his debut album Synergy is expected to be released sometime in late 2010. The song Hanging Habagat was released on October 19, 2010, and will serve as a physical carrier single of the album simultaneous to the release of its music video. Other singles that followed were Sa 'Yo Lang (feat. Julianne Tarroja) and "Sari-Saring Kwento" (feat. Gloc-9 and Noel Cabangon).

Lui-Pio established an independent local music label Mecca Music in early 2011. Somedaydream was the first to sign up to the label as mainstream contract artist. He had also reunited with members from his former band and planned to release a debut single with them on early-2015.

Discography

With Hale

 For a full, detailed list, see: Hale discography

As a solo artist

Studio albums

Singles

References

1982 births
Living people
De La Salle–College of Saint Benilde alumni
Filipino guitarists
21st-century Filipino male singers
People from Quezon City
Musicians from Metro Manila
Former members of Iglesia ni Cristo
PolyEast Records artists
Converts to Roman Catholicism from Unitarianism